Highway 1 is an Iraqi highway which extends from Baghdad to Qamishli in Syria.  It passes through Baqubah, Taji, Samarra, Tikrit and Mosul.

Roads in Iraq